Parismina Airport  is an airport that serves Parismina, a coastal town in Siquirres Canton, Limón Province, Costa Rica. In some cases the airport is also referred as Barra de Parismina Airport.

Parismina Airport has a concrete airstrip of 900 m and very few basic facilities for passengers, although the airport is in downtown Parismina, next to the village's cemetery. The airport is owned and managed by the country's Directorate General of Civil Aviation.

Currently, there are no scheduled domestic services to Parismina airport, but the airfield is constantly served by charter services.

Passenger Statistics
These data show number of passengers movements into the airport, according to the Directorate General of Civil Aviation of Costa Rica's Statistical Yearbooks.

References

Airports in Costa Rica
Buildings and structures in Limón Province